Marznak may refer to:
 Bala Marznak
 Pain Marznak